Easthope Halt railway station was a station in Easthope Wood on Wenlock Edge, Easthope, Shropshire, England. The station was opened in 1936 and closed in 1951.

References

Further reading

Disused railway stations in Shropshire
Railway stations in Great Britain opened in 1936
Railway stations in Great Britain closed in 1951
Former Great Western Railway stations